Man is an album from British musician Francis Dunnery, released in 2001. It saw Francis experimenting with new sounds, most notably programmed drum beats - a departure from what had been the norm in his studio work up to this point. Vocalist/keyboardist Erin Moran (of A Girl Called Eddy) features heavily on the album.

Track listing
 "I'm in Love"
 "Flower Girl"
 "Me and Franciene"
 "Yonder Mountain"
 "Hold Out Your Heart"
 "Blinded by the Memory"
 "In the Garden of Mystic Lovers"
 "Wounding and Healing"
 "The Ava Song"
 "The Only Thing"
 "Hometown"
 "Close my Door"

References

2001 albums
Francis Dunnery albums